The R358 is a Regional Route in South Africa that connects the N7 north of Bitterfontein with the Namibian border at Onseepkans via Pofadder.

Route
Starting from the N7 it heads north-east. It meets the R355 from the south-east and the two become co-signed. The routes cross into the Northern Cape before again diverging. Continuing north-east it reaches Pofadder after some 230 kilometres. Here it meets the N14 at a staggered junction. Leaving the town, it heads north to its terminus at  Velloorsdrif Border Post at Onseepkans. Heading north into Namibia, the route continues as the C10.

External links
 Routes Travel Info

References

Regional Routes in the Western Cape
Regional Routes in the Northern Cape